Ivan Botha is a South African actor who is known for his role as Pieter van Heerden in 7de Laan and for his appearance in an Afrikaans-language film.

He made his debut in the Rapid Heart Pictures horror movie The Raven, directed by David DeCoteau, and has since appeared in the Bakgat! series, and the television show Getroud met rugby.

Filmography

Television

Film

References

External links
 

1985 births
Living people
Afrikaner people
South African male film actors
South African male soap opera actors
South African male television actors